Some foods have always been common in every continent, such as many seafood and plants. Examples of these are honey, ants, mussels, crabs and coconuts. Nikolai Vavilov initially identified the centers of origin for eight crop plants, subdividing them further into twelve groups in 1935.

Africa

West Africa

Many foods were originally domesticated in West Africa, including grains like African rice, Pearl Millet, Sorghum, and Fonio; tree crops like Kola nut, used in Coca-Cola, and Oil Palm; and other globally important plant foods such as Watermelon, Tamarind, Okra, Black-eye peas, and Yams.  Additionally, the regionally important poultry animal Guinea Fowl was domesticated in West Africa. Some of these crops were domesticated at least 4,500 years ago.

Around 4000 BCE the climate of the Sahara and the Sahel started to become drier at an exceedingly fast pace. This climate change caused lakes and rivers to shrink significantly and caused increasing desertification, potentially reducing the wild food supply and spurring people to domesticate plant crops. This, in turn, decreased the amount of land conducive to settlements and helped to cause migrations of farming communities to the more humid climate of West Africa.

Ethiopian Highlands
The most famous crop domesticated in the Ethiopian highlands is coffee. Khat, ensete, noog, teff and finger millet were also domesticated in the Ethiopian highlands.

Europe

Plants

Fruits

 Blackberry (Rubus ulmifolius)
 Blackcurrant (Ribes nigrum)
 Briançon apricot
 Cherry (Prunus avium)
 Cherry plum
 Cloudberry (Rubus chamaemorus)
 Crab apple (Malus sylvestris)
 Damson
 Elderberry (Sambucus nigra)
 European cranberrybush
 Gooseberry (R. uva-crispa)
 Grape (Vitis vinifera)
 Hawberry (Crataegus laevigata)
 Italian plum (Prunus cocomilia)
 Juniper berry
 Lingonberry (Vaccinium vitis-idaea)
 Pear (Pyrus communis)
 Plum (Prunus domestica)
 Raspberry (Rubus idaeus)
 Redcurrant
 Seaberry (Hippophae rhamnoides)
 Sloe (Prunus spinosa)
 Bilberry

Vegetables

 Angelica
 Cabbage
 Parsnips
 Radish
 Rapeseed
 Turnip
Green beans

Herbs

 Caraway
 Dill
 Hops
 Tarragon
 Thyme
 Oregano
 Wormwood

Other

 Chestnuts
 Hazelnuts
 Pine Nut

Meat

 Duck
 Rabbit
 Pork
 Beef

Mediterranean
There was a great deal of commerce between the provinces of the Roman Empire. All the regions of the empire became interdependent with one another; some provinces specialized in the production of grain, others in wine and others in olive oil, depending on the soil type.  Columella writes in his Res Rustica, "Soil that is heavy, chalky, and wet is not unsuited to the growing for winter wheat  and spelt. Barley tolerates no place except one that is loose and dry." Pliny the Elder writes extensively about agriculture from books XII to XIX; in fact, XVIII is The Natural History of Grain. Crops grown on Roman farms included wheat, barley, millet, pea, broad bean, lentil, flax, sesame, chickpea, hemp, turnip, olives, pear, apples, figs, and plums. Others in the Mediterranean include:

 Beets
 Broccoli
 Brussels sprouts
 Caper
 Catnip (nepeta)
 Cauliflower
 Centaurium
 Fennel
 Kale
 Kohlrabi
 Vitis vinifera

Mediterranean and subtropical fruits 
Fruits in this category are not hardy to extreme cold, as the preceding temperate fruits are, yet tolerate some frost and may have a modest chilling requirement. Notable among these are natives of the Mediterranean:

 Medlar (Mespilus germanica; Rosaceae)
 Black mulberry (Morus nigra; Moraceae)
 Cornelian cherry (Cornus mas; Cornaceae)
 Date palm (Phoenix dactylifera; Arecaceae)
 Fig (Ficus spp. Moraceae)
 Grape, called raisin, sultana, or currant when it is dried (Vitis spp.; Vitaceae)
 Jujube (Ziziphus zizyphus; Rhamnaceae)
 Olive (Olea europea; Oleaceae)
 Pomegranate (Punica granatum; Punicaceae)
 Sycamore fig (Ficus sycomorus. Moraceae), also called old world sycomore or just sycomore

Asia

Common across Asia

Fruits
These are some fruits native to Asia or of Asian origin.

 Apple (Malus pumila)
 Apricot (Prunus armeniaca)
 Japanese barberry (Berberis thunbergii); Berberidaceae
 Arhat (Siraitia grosvenorii; Cucurbitaceae), also called longevity fruit
 Che (Maclura tricuspidata; Moraceae), also called cudrania, Chinese mulberry, cudrang, Mandarin melon berry, silkworm thorn, or zhe
 Ziziphus jujuba, commonly called jujube, red date, Chinese date
 Benincasa hispida, Cucurbitaceae, AKA wax gourd, ash pumpkin, or Chinese Preserving Melon.
 Durian (Durio spp; family Malvaceae) related  Indian origins okra 
 Goumi (Elaeagnus multiflora ovata; family Elaeagnaceae)
 Hardy kiwi (Actinidia arguta; family Actinidiaceae)
 Jackfruit (Artocarpus heterophyllus); family Moraceae)
 Kiwifruit or Chinese gooseberry (Actinidia spp.; Actinidiaceae)
 Lanzones (Lansium domesticum; family Meliaceae)
 Lapsi (Choerospondias axillaris Roxb. Anacardiaceae)
 Longan (Dimocarpus longan; family Sapindaceae)
 Loquat (Eriobotrya japonica; Rosaceae)
 Lychee (Litchi chinensis; Sapindaceae)
 Mango (Mangifera indica; Anacardiaceae)
 Mangosteen (Garcinia mangostana; family Clusiaceae)
 Mock strawberry or Indian strawberry (Potentilla indica; Rosaceae)
 Nungu (Borassus flabellifer; Arecaceae)
 Peach (Prunus persica; Rosaceae)
 Pear (Pyrus pyrifolia)
 Persimmon (aka Sharon fruit)  (Diospyros kaki; Ebenaceae)
 Pomegranate (Punica granatum;Lythraceae) 
 Rambutan (Nephelium lappaceum; Sapindaceae)
 Sageretia (Sageretia theezans; Rhamnaceae), also called mock buckthorn

Middle East or West Asia

The Neolithic founder crops (or primary domesticates) are the eight plant species that were domesticated by early Holocene (Pre-Pottery Neolithic A and Pre-Pottery Neolithic B) farming communities in the Fertile Crescent region of southwest Asia, and which formed the basis of systematic agriculture in the Middle East, North Africa, India, Persia and (later) Europe. They consist of flax, three cereals and four pulses, and are the first known domesticated plants in the world. Although domesticated rye (Secale cereale) occurs in the final Epi-Palaeolithic strata at Tell Abu Hureyra (the earliest instance of a domesticated plant species), it was insignificant in the Neolithic Period of southwest Asia and only became common with the spread of farming into northern Europe several millennia later.

Cereals and pseudocereals

 Barley (Hordeum vulgare/sativum, descended from the wild H. spontaneum)
 Einkorn (Triticum monococcum, descended from the wild T. boeoticum)
 Emmer (Triticum dicoccum, descended from the wild T. dicoccoides)
 Flax (Linum usitatissimum)
 Oats
 Wheat
 Rye

Vegetables

Pulses

 Bitter vetch (Vicia ervilia)
 Chickpea (Cicer arietinum)
 Lentil (Lens culinaris)
 Pea (Pisum sativum)

Fruits

 Pomegranates
 Grapes (Vitis vinifera)
 Dates
 Medlar (Mespilus germanica)
 Muskmelon

Other

 Carrots
 Leeks
 Lettuce
 Onions
 Parsley
 Radishes
 Almond
 Linseed (Linum usitatissimum)
 Asafoetida
 Mustard
 Fig (Ficus carica)

Indian Subcontinent

Around 7000 BCE, sesame and brinjal were harvested and humped cattle were domesticated in the Indus Valley. By 3000 BCE, spices, like turmeric, cardamom, black pepper and mustard seed were harvested.

Fruit

 Mango
 Lemon
 Lime
 Citron
 Coconut – Indo-Atlantic group
 Jackfruit
 Malabar plum (Syzygium cumini)
 Ceylon gooseberry
 Phalsa – Berry
 Neolamarckia cadamba – Kadamba
 Bengal currant 
 Wood apple

Vegetables

 Cucumber
 Eggplant
 Pigeon pea 
 Mungo bean
 Moth bean
 Mung bean – Green gram
 Horseradish tree 
 Snake Gourd 
 Ivy gourd (Coccinia indica)

Spices and Herbs

 Cinnamon
 Black Pepper
 Cardamom
 Turmeric
 Long pepper
 Curry leaf
 Holy basil
 Black cumin
 Indian mustard (Brassica juncea)
 Jakhya – Wild mustard
 Indian gooseberry
 Betel – Leaf
 Kewra – Screwpine
 Vetiver
 Sal tree – Shorea robusta
 Spearmint
 Indian bay leaf (Cinnamomum tamala)
 Lemongrass (Cymbopogon flexuosus)
 Neem (Azadirachta Indica)
 Ashwagandha
 Shatamull (Asparagus racemosus)
 Radhuni – Indian ajwain

Grains

 Indian barnyard millet 
 Raishan (Digitaria compacta)
 Jungle rice (Echinochloa colona)
 Little Millet

Meat

 Zebu 
 Red jungle fowl
 Grey jungle fowl

Other

 Sesame seed (Sesamum indicum)
 Sugarcane (Saccharum barberi)

North Asia
 Blackcurrant
 Cabbage
 Chamoe

Tibetan plateau
 Barley

East Asia

Fruits
 Apple
 Goji berries 
 Hawthorn or hawberry
 Kiwifruit
 Kumquats
 Longan
 Loquat
 Lychee
 Mandarin Orange
 Sweet Orange
 Peach (Prunus persica)
 Pear or Asian Pear (Pyrus pyrifolia)
 Persimmon (Diospyros kaki)
 Korean raspberry (Rubus crataegifolius)
 Tangerines
 Yangmei

Vegetables
 Mustard
 Ginseng

Grains
 Soybean
 Foxtail Millet
 Rice
 Buckwheat

Oceania

Australia

Fruits of Australian origin 
Although the fruits of Australia were eaten for thousands of years as bushfood by Aboriginal people, they have only been recently recognized for their culinary qualities by non-indigenous people. Many are regarded for their piquancy and spice-like qualities for use in cooking and preserves. Some Australian fruits also have exceptional nutritional qualities, including high vitamin C and other antioxidants.

 Atherton raspberry (Rubus probus; Rosaceae)
 Black apple (Planchonella australis; Sapotaceae)
 Blue tongue (Melastoma affine; Melastomataceae)
 Bolwarra (Eupomatia laurina; Eupomatiaceae)
 Broad-leaf bramble (Rubus hillii; Rosaceae)
 Burdekin plum (Pleiogynium timoriense; Anacardiaceae)
 Cedar Bay cherry (Eugenia carissoides; Myrtaceae)
 Cluster fig (Ficus racemosa; Moraceae)
 Common apple-berry (Billardiera scandens; Pittosporaceae)
 Conkerberry (Carissa lanceolata; Apocynaceae)
 Davidson's plum (Davidsonia spp.; Cunoniaceae)
 Desert fig (Ficus platypoda; Moraceae)
 Desert lime (Citrus glauca; Rutaceae)
 Doubah (Marsdenia australis; Apocynaceae)
 Emu apple (Owenia acidula; Meliaceae)
 Fibrous satinash (Syzygium fibrosum; Myrtaceae)
 Finger lime (Citrus australasica; Rutaceae)
 Illawarra plum (Podocarpus elatus; Podocarpaceae)
 Kakadu lime (Citrus gracilis; Rutaceae)
 Kakadu plum (Terminalia ferdinandiana; Combretaceae)
 Karkalla (Carpobrotus rossii; Aizoaceae)
 Kutjera (Solanum centrale; Solanaceae)
 Lady apple (Syzygium suborbiculare; Myrtaceae)
 Lemon aspen (Acronychia acidula; Rutaceae)
 Little gooseberry tree (Buachanania arborescens; Anacardiaceae)
 Midyim (Austromyrtus dulcis; Myrtaceae)
 Mountain pepper (Tasmannia spp.; Winteraceae)
 Muntries (Kunzea pomifera; Myrtaceae)
 Native cherry (Exocarpus cupressiformis; Santalaceae)
 Native currant (Acrotriche depressa; Ericaceae)
 Native gooseberry (Physalis minima; Solanaceae)
 Pigface (Carpobrotus glaucescens; Aizoaceae)
 Pink-flowered native raspberry (Rubus parvifolius; Rosaceae)
 Purple apple-berry (Billardiera longiflora; Pittosporaceae)
 Quandong (Santalum acuminatum; Elaeocarpaceae)
 Riberry (Syzygium luehmannii; Myrtaceae)
 Rose myrtle (Archirhodomyrtus beckleri; Myrtaceae)
 Rose-leaf Bramble (Rubus rosifolius; Rosaceae)
 Sandpaper fig (Ficus coronata; Moraceae)
 Small-leaf tamarind (Diploglottis campbellii; Sapindaceae)
 Snow berry (Gaultheria hispida; Ericaceae)
 Sweet apple-berry (Billardiera cymosa; Pittosporaceae)
 Tanjong (Mimusops elengi; Sapindaceae)
 White aspen (Acronychia oblongifolia; Rutaceae)
 Wild orange (Capparis mitchellii; Capparaceae)
 Wongi (Manilkara kauki; Sapotaceae)
 Yellow plum (Ximenia americana; Olacaceae)
 Zig zag vine (Melodurum leichhardtii; Annonaceae)

Root crops
 Murnong (Microseris lanceolata; Asteraceae)

Seeds and nuts
 Aniseed myrtle
 Macadamia nuts

Austranesia and New Guinea

Austronesia is the broad region covering the islands of both the Indian and the Pacific oceans settled by Austronesian peoples originating from Taiwan and southern China, starting at around 3,500 to 2,000 BCE. These regions include Island Southeast Asia, Near Oceania (Melanesia), Remote Oceania (Micronesia and Polynesia), Madagascar, and the Comoros Islands. Contact and cultural exchange with early Papuan agriculture in New Guinea also led to homogenization of the agriculture of the two ethnolinguistic groups. The plants originating from Austronesia and New Guinea include:

Meat
Bos javanicus (banteng)
Bubalus bubalis (carabao)
 Wagyu (beef)

Animal products
Aerodramus fuciphagus (edible-nest swiftlet)

Seafood
Birgus latro (coconut crab) 
Macrobrachium rosenbergii (giant freshwater prawn)

Nuts

Barringtonia edulis
Barringtonia novae-hiberniae
Barringtonia procera
Canarium harveyi
Canarium indicum 
Canarium ovatum (pili)
Canarium salomonense 
Castanopsis acuminatissima
Cocos nucifera (coconut)
Cordia subcordata (beach cordia)
Euryale ferox (fox nut)
Finschia chloroxanthia
Gnetum latifolium
Inocarpus fagifer (Tahitian chestnut)
Omphalea gageana
Pangium edule (pangi)
Terminalia catappa (sea almond)
Terminalia kaernbachii (okari nut)
Sterculia vitiensis

Grains
Coix lachryma-jobi (Job's tears)
Oryza sativa (rice)

Root crops

Alocasia macrorrhizos (giant taro)
Alpinia galanga (lengkuas)
 Alpinia vanoverberghii (akbab)
Amomum acre (panasa cardamom)
Amomum lepicarpum (gadang)
Amorphophallus paeoniifolius (elephant foot yam)
Boesenbergia rotunda (fingerroot)
Colocasia esculenta (taro)
Cordyline fruticosa (ti)
Curcuma longa (turmeric)
Cyrtosperma merkusii (swamp taro)
Dioscorea alata (ube, purple yam)
Dioscorea bulbifera (air yam)
Dioscorea hispida (intoxicating yam)
Dioscorea esculenta (lesser yam)
Dioscorea nummularia (Pacific yam)
Dioscorea pentaphylla (fiveleaf yam)
Dioscorea transversa (pencil yam)
Eleocharis dulcis (water chestnut)
Etlingera elatior (torch ginger)
Hedychium coronarium (ginger lily)
Ipomoea batatas (sweet potato)
Leptosolena haenkei (poli)
Pueraria lobata (East Asian arrowroot)
Tacca leontopetaloides (Polynesian arrowroot)
Zingiber officinale (ginger)
Zingiber zerumbet (bitter ginger)

Vegetables and herbs

Abelmoschus manihot (island cabbage)
Amaranthus gracilis (green amaranth)
Amaranthus tricolor (Chinese spinach)
Asplenium spp.
Athyrium spp.
Ctenitis spp.
Cyathea spp. (tree ferns)
Cymbopogon spp. (lemongrass)
Dennstaedtia spp.
Diplazium spp.
Diplazium esculentum (pako)
Dryopteris spp.
Erythrina variegata (coral tree)
Ficus copiosa (sandpaper cabbage)
Gnetum gnemon 
Ipomoea aquatica (water spinach)
Lageneria siceraria (bottle gourd)
Laportea interrupta
Pandanus amaryllifolius (pandan)
Piper cubeba (cubeb pepper)
Piper ornatum (Celebes pepper)
Piper retrofractum (Javanese long pepper)
Piper sarmentosum (lolot pepper)
Polyscias spp. (panax)
Saccharum edule
Setaria palmifolia
Syzygium aromaticum (clove)
Syzygium polyanthum (Indonesian bay leaf)

Fruits

Anacolosa frutescens (galo)
Antidesma bunius (bugnay)
Antidesma montanum
Artocarpus altilis (breadfruit)
Artocarpus anisophyllus (entawak)
Artocarpus camansi (breadnut)
Artocarpus heterophyllus (jackfruit)
Artocarpus integer (cempedak)
Artocarpus lacucha (lakuch)
Artocarpus mariannensis (Marianas breadfruit)
Artocarpus odoratissimus (marang)
Artocarpus treculianus (tipuho)
Averrhoa bilimbi (bilimbi)
Averrhoa carambola (star fruit)
Benincasa hispida (wax gourd)
Burckella obovata (red silkwood)
Calamus manillensis (edible rattan)
Citrus hystrix (kaffir lime)
Citrus halimii (mountain citron)
Citrus macroptera (Melanesian papeda)
Citrus hystrix var. micrantha (small-fruited papeda)
Citrus microcarpa (calamansi)
Citrus x webberii (kalpi)
Clymenia platypoda
Clymenia polyandra 
Corynocarpus cribbianus
Cryptocarya aromatica
Cucumis sativus (cucumber)
Dillenia philippinensis (elephant apple or katmon)
Dimocarpus didyma (alupag)
Dimocarpus longan (longan)
Diospyros discolor (velvet apple)
Dracontomelon costatum
Dracontomelon dao (dragon plum)
Dracontomelon duperreanum
Dracontomelon lenticulatum 
Dracontomelon vitiense
Durio spp. (durian)
Elaeagnus triflora (millaa vine)
Embelia philippinensis (lando)
Ficus minahassae (alomit)
Ficus tinctoria
Ficus wassa
Flacourtia rukam (rukam)
Garcinia binucao (binukaw)
Garcinia mangostana (mangosteen)
Garcinia prainiana (button mangosteen)
Garcinia pseudoguttifera
Garcinia vidalii (piris)
Hornstedtia scottiana (jiddo)
Lansium parasiticum (lanzones)
Melastoma malabathricum 
Mangifera foetida
Mangifera minor
Medinilla pendula
Morinda citrifolia (noni)
Morus alba (white mulberry)
Musa spp. (banana)
Musa × troglodytarum (fe'i banana)
Nephelium chryseum
Nephelium lappaceum (rambutan)
Nephelium philippense (bulala)
Pandanus conoideus
Pandanus lamekotensis
Pandanus tectorius 
Parartocarpus venenosa
Pipturus argenteus
Pometia pinnata (island lychee)
Puteria maclayana
Rubus ellipticus (golden Himalayan raspberyy)
Rubus fraxinifolius
Rubus rosifolius (Vanuatu raspberry)
Sandoricum koetjape (santol)
Spondias cytherea (golden apple)
Syzygium aqueum (water apple)
Syzygium cumini (Java plum)
Syzygium jambos (jambos)
Syzygium lineatum (lubeg)
Syzygium malaccense (Mountain apple)
Syzygium polycephaloides (lipote)
Syzygium samarangense (Java apple)
Terminalia megalocarpa
Terminalia solomonensis
Terminalia lapalagon
Vaccinium barandanum (lusong)
Vaccinium myrtoides (ayosep)

Other

Areca catechu (areca nut)
Arenga pinnata (arenga sugar palm)
Borassus flabellifer (tala palm)
Calamus hollrungii
Caryota rumphiana
Caryota urens (toddy palm or fishtail palm)
Caulerpa lentillifera (latô)
Cinnamomum mercadoi (kalingag)
Cinnamomum parthenoxylon (saffron laurel)
Cycas rumphii (queen sago palm)
Cycas scratchleyana
Eucheuma spp. (gusô)
Gelidiaceae (agar)
Metroxylon amicarum
Metroxylon bougainvillense
Metroxylon sagu (sago palm)
Metroxylon solomonense
Metroxylon vitiense
Metroxylon warburgii
Myristica spp. (wild nutmeg)
Nypa fruticans (nipa palm)
Piper betle (betel)
Piper methysticum (kava)
Saccharum spp. (sugarcane)

Americas

Corn, beans and squash were domesticated in Mesoamerica around 3500 BCE. Potatoes, quinoa and manioc were domesticated in South America. In what is now the eastern United States, Native Americans domesticated sunflower and sumpweed around 2500 BCE.

North America

Nuts
 Acorn  (Quercus alba, Quercus gambelii, Quercus kelloggii, Notholithocarpus densiflorus; Fagaceae)
 American chestnut (Castanea dentata; Fagaceae)
 Black walnut (Juglans nigra; Juglandaceae)
 Hazelnut (Corylus americana; Corylaceae)
 Hickory nut (Carya; Juglandaceae)
 Pecans (Carya illinoinensis; Juglandaceae)
 Shagbark hickory (Carya ovata; Juglandaceae)
 White walnut (Juglans cinerea; Juglandaceae)

Vegetables and grains

 American ginseng (Panax quinquefolius)
 Araliaceae
 Chives (Allium schoenoprasum; Amaryllidaceae)
 Dandelions
 Echinacea (Asteroideae; Heliantheae; Asteraceae)
 Erect knotweed
 Jerusalem artichoke (Helianthus tuberosus; Asteraceae), also known as topinambour
 Little barley
 Maple sap (Acer; Hippocastanoideae)
 Maygrass
 Pole beans (Phaseolus coccineus; Faboideae)
 Sage (Salvia apiana; Lamiaceae)
 Sumpweed
 Sunflowers (Helianthus annuus; Asteraceae)
 Wild rice (Zizania palustris; Poaceae)

Fruits
Canada, Mexico, and the United States are home to a number of edible fruit; however, only three are commercially grown (grapes, cranberries, and blueberries). Many of the fruits below are still eaten locally as they have been for centuries and others are generating renewed interest by eco-friendly gardeners (less need for bug control) and chefs alike.

 American elderberry (Sambucus canadensis; Adoxaceae)
 American grape: North American species (e.g., Vitis labrusca; Vitaceae) and American-European hybrids are grown where grape (Vitis vinifera) is not hardy and are used as rootstocks
 American mayapple (Podophyllum peltatum; Berberidaceae)
 American persimmon (Diospyros virginiana; Ebenaceae): traditional for desserts and as dried fruit
 American plum (Prunus americana; Rosaceae)
 Beach plum (Prunus maritima; Rosaceae)
 Black cherry (Prunus serotina; Rosaceae): popular flavoring for pies, jams, and sweets
 Black raspberry (Rubus occidentalis or Rubus leucodermis; Rosaceae)
 Blueberry (Vaccinium, sect. Cyanococcus; Ericaceae) 
 Buffaloberry (Shepherdia argentea; Elaeagnaceae), which grows wild in the prairies of Canada.
 Canada plum (Prunus nigra; Rosaceae)
 Canadian serviceberry (Amelanchier canadensis; Rosaceae), also called sugarplum
 Chokecherry (Prunus virginiana; Rosaceae)
 Cocoplum (Chrysobalanus icaco; Chrysobalanaceae)
 Concord grape
 Cranberry (Vaccinium oxycoccus; Ericaceae)
 Dewberry (Rubus, sect. Flagellares, American dewberries; Rosaceae)
 Desert Apricot (Prunus Fremontii; Rosaceae)
 Eastern May Hawthorn (Crataegus aestivalis; Rosaceae), better known as mayhaw
 False-mastic (Mastichodendron foetidissimum; Sapotaceae)
 Florida strangler fig (Ficus aurea; Moraceae)
 Ground plum (Astragalus caryocarpus; Fabaceae), also called ground-plum milk-vetch
 Huckleberry (Vaccinium parvifolium; Ericaceae)
 Maypop (Passiflora incarnata; Passifloraceae), traditionally a summer treat
 Pawpaw (Asimina triloba; Annonaceae), not to be confused with papaya (Carica papaya; Caricaceae), which is called "pawpaw" in some English dialects
 Pigeon plum (Coccoloba diversifolia; Polygonaceae)
 Prickly pear (Opuntia spp.,; Cactaceae), used as both a fruit and vegetable depending on part of plant
 Pumpkin (Cucurbita; Cucurbitaceae)
 Red mulberry (Morus rubra; Moraceae)
 Salal berry (Gaultheria shallon; Ericaceae)
 Salmonberry (Rubus spectabilis; Rosaceae)
 Saskatoonberry (Amelanchier alnifolia, Rosaceae)
 Saw palmetto (Serenoa repens; Arecaceae)
 Southern crabapple (Malus angustifolia; Rosaceae)
 Squash (Cucurbita; Cucurbitaceae
 Strawberry (Fragaria × ananassa; Rosaceae)
 Thimbleberry (Rubus parviflorus; Rosaceae)
 Toyon (Heteromeles arbutifolia; Rosaceae)
 Wintergreen (Gaultheria procumbens; Ericaceae)

Meat
Many animal meats originated in North America examples include
Alligator meat
American lobster
Bison meat
Turkey meat

Pacific Northwest

Provisionally, this is primarily southern Coast Salish, though much is in common with Coast Salish overall.

Anthropogenic grasslands were maintained.  The south Coast Salish may have had more vegetables and land game than people farther north or on the outer coast. Salmon and other fish were staples in this area.  There was kokanee, a freshwater fish in the Lake Washington and Lake Sammamish watersheds.  Shellfish were abundant.  Butter clams, horse clams, and cockles were dried for trade.

Hunting was specialized; professions were probably sea hunters, land hunters, and fowlers.  Water fowl were captured on moonless nights using strategic flares.

The managed grasslands not only provided game habitat, but vegetable sprouts, roots, bulbs, berries, and nuts were foraged from them as well as found wild.  The most important were probably bracken and camas, and wapato especially for the Duwamish.  Many, many varieties of berries were foraged; some were harvested with comblike devices not reportedly used elsewhere.  Acorns were relished but were not widely available.  Regional tribes went in autumn to the Nisqually Flats (Nisqually plains) to harvest them.  Indeed, the region was so abundant that the southern Puget Sound as a whole had one of the only sedentary hunter-gatherer societies that has ever existed.

Mexico and Central America
Common fruits and vegetables:

 Agave
 Allspice
 Amaranth
 Avocado
 Black Sapote (Diospyros nigra)
 Cas
 Cassava (Yuca)
 Chia seed
 Chili pepper
 Cacao
 Common bean (Phaseolus vulgaris)
 Guava
 Jicama
 Corn (Maize)
 Mamey sapote (Pouteria sapota)
 Lima beans
 Papaya
 Peanut
 Tuna (Prickly Pear)
 Pitaya (Dragonfruit)
 Guanábana
 Squash
 Sweet potato (Camote)
 Tobacco
 Tomatoes
 Tomatillo
 Vanilla

The Caribbean

Fruit
 Quenepa
 Ackee

South America

Meat

 Alpacas
 Armadillo
 Capybara
 Guinea pigs
 Llama
 Rhea (bird)

Grain and beans

 Andean lupin
 Brazil nut
 Cacao
 French bean
 Madagascar bean
 Peanut
 Quinoa

Herbs

 Achiote
 Anacahuita
 Boldo
 Cat's Claw
 Coca
 Culantro
 Courbaril
 Guaco
 Guayusa
 Lemon-verbena
 Marcela
 Yerba mate

Vegetables

 Cassava
 Oca
 Papalisa
 Potatoes
 Sweet potatoes

Fruit

 Açaí berries
 Araza
 Avocado
 Black Sapote
 Butiá fruit
 Cape gooseberry (uchuva)
 Cashew
 Chile peppers
 Chilean Guava (also called Murta)
 Chirimoya
 Jabuticaba
 Feijoa
 Guaviyú fruit
 Granadilla
 Guaraná berries
 Guava
 Naranjilla or Lulo
 Papaya
 Passion fruit
 Pineapple
 Pitanga berries
 Saúco
 Squash
 Tamarillo
 Tomato

River fish

 Piranha
 Surubi
 Tararira

Sea food

 Anchovie
 Centolla
 Corvina (fish)
 Jaiva

See also

 
 List of culinary fruits
 List of culinary herbs and spices
 List of culinary nuts
 List of dried foods
 List of edible seeds
 List of snack foods
 List of vegetables

References

Lists of foods
Lists of plants